The Cabin Collective is an Irish country-rock band formed in Tuam, Galway in 2013. The band, which takes its name from the Scandinavian-style log cabin where they rehearse, was formed as a result of a fellow Tuam band, The Saw Doctors, taking a temporary break. During that break, three members of the Saw Doctors – Moran, O'Neill, and Thistlethwaite - joined with fellow Galway musicians (including Keith Mullins, a regular support act of the Saw Doctors, and former Saw Doctors drummer Eímhín Cradock).

The band played their debut live gig on 26 April 2013, at An Taibhdhearc as part of the Cúirt Festival. Earlier that week, they appeared on The Late Late Show, playing an updated version of Keith Mullins' song "Lines Are Fading".

The band released their second single Marrakech on 1 November 2013.

References

Rock music supergroups
People from Tuam
Musical groups established in 2013
Musical groups from County Galway
Country rock musical groups
2013 establishments in Ireland
Irish rock music groups